The International Federation of Associations of Anatomists (IFAA) is an umbrella scientific organization of national and multinational Anatomy Associations, dedicated to anatomy and biomorphological sciences.

Origins and objectives
In 1903, Prof. Nicolas, from Nancy, France, was successful in founding the International Federation of Associations of Anatomists.

The first International Congress of Anatomy was held in Geneva in 1905 and started as a committee to organize five yearly conferences.

56 member Associations of the International Federation of Associations of Anatomists. The IFAA is the only international body representing all aspects of anatomy and anatomical associations.

Since 1989 the Federative International Committee on Anatomical Terminology (FICAT) under IFAA auspices, has met to analyze and study the international morphological terminology (Anatomy, Histology and Embryology), releasing updated Terminologia Anatomica in 1998 and Terminologia Histologica in 2008.

Years, cities and presidencies

 I Congress - 1905 - Geneva, Switzerland - Prof. D' Eternod
 II Congress - 1910 - Brussels, Belgium - Prof. Waldeyer
 III Congress - 1930 - Amsterdam, The Netherlands - Prof. Van den Broek
 IV Congress - 1936 - Milan, Italy - Prof. Livini
 V Congress - 1950 - Oxford, England, The UK - Prof. Le Gros Clark
 VI Congress - 1955 - Paris, France - Prof. Collin
 VII Congress - 1960 - New York, USA - Prof. Bennett
 VIII Congress - 1965 - Weisbaden, Germany - Prof. Bargmann
 IX Congress - 1970 - Leningrad, Russia - Prof. Jdanov
 X Congress - 1975 - Tokyo, Japan - Prof. Nakayama
 XI Congress - 1980 - Mexico City, Mexico - Prof. Acosta Vidrio
 XII Congress - 1985 - London, The UK - Prof. Harrison
 XIII Congress - 1989 - Rio de Janeiro, Brazil - Prof. Moscovici
 XIV Congress - 1994 - Lisbon, Portugal - Prof. Esperança Pina
 XV Congress - 1999 - Rome, Italy
 XVI Congress - 2004 - Kyoto, Japan
 XVII Congress - 2009 - Cape Town, South Africa
 XVIII Congress - 2014 - Beijing, PR China
 XIX Congress - 2019 - London, The UK - Prof. D. Ceri Davies

See also
 Nomina Anatomica
 Pan American Association of Anatomy
 Terminologia Anatomica

References

External links
 Official site of International Federation of Associations of Anatomists
 History

Anatomists
International medical and health organizations
Organizations established in 1903